Samuel P. Hirsch (born c. 1948) is a lawyer who also held public office.

Early life
He was born in a DP camp to Holocaust-survivor parents who came to the United States a year later. In the way of his parents, he is an Orthodox Jew.

His Juris Doctor degree is from New York University School of Law (1972) and his first law position was with Jacob D. Fuchsberg.

Career

Elected official
In 1977 he won a three-way primary and, after a three-way November election, became a New York State Assemblyman (48th District). His seat had been vacated by Leonard Silverman, who accepted an offered judgeship mid-term.

In 1982 he was challenged by Dov Hikind in the September primary; Hikind received about 500 more votes.

One of the issues for which he represented his community is reverse discrimination. Another was in the matter of more police protection, especially in the aftermath of "the fatal stabbing of an elderly Jewish man in a predawn street robbery."

Lawyer
In 2002 he filed a Class action lawsuit against McDonald's for alleged deceptive practices that resulted in obesity, particularly among teenagers; it was rejected in a Federal court. The ruling permitted refiling, which he did. It too was rejected.

His "bread and butter" cases are in the area of personal injury.

Family
He and his wife Ruth are the parents of four children and grandparents of six.

References

1940s births
Living people
Year of birth uncertain
20th-century American politicians
American Orthodox Jews
Jewish American state legislators in New York (state)
American lawyers
Democratic Party members of the New York State Assembly
New York University School of Law alumni
Politicians from Brooklyn